The 1950–53 Mediterranean Cup or 1950-53 Eastern Mediterranean Cup was the second tournament of the Mediterranean Cup, which is a football competition contested by men's national teams and national B teams of the states bordering the Mediterranean Sea. The tournament was played on the road and spanned three years, and it was played in a round-robin system in which the four teams involved played two matches against each other. Egypt, Turkey and Greece participated with their A teams, while Italy disputed this tournament with their B team, and they won with 8 points while Greece finished in second with 7 points.

Results

Group

Top Scorers

References

External links 
Mediterranean Cup results

Sport in the Mediterranean